Deutsches Eck ("German Corner") is the name of a promontory in Koblenz, Germany, where the Mosel river joins the Rhine. Named after a local commandry of the Teutonic Order ("Teutonischer Orden"), it became known for a monumental equestrian statue of William I, first German Emperor, erected in 1897 in appreciation of his role in the unification of Germany. One of many Emperor William monuments raised in the Prussian Rhine Province, it was destroyed in World War II and only the plinth was preserved as a memorial. Following German reunification, a replica of the statue was erected on the pedestal after controversial discussions in 1993. It is today a Koblenz monument and a popular tourist attraction.

History

The Teutonic Knights were called to Koblenz by the archbishop of Trier, Theoderich von Wied, in 1216 and vested with the estates around the Basilica of St. Castor located directly at the confluence of Mosel and Rhine. Serving mainly in nursing care, the knights soon after established a commandry (Deutschordenskommende) here, which became the administrative seat of the Koblenz bailiwick directly subordinate to the Grand Master. The premises centred on the Deutschherrenhaus building were erected from 1279 onwards and became known as the Deutsches Eck.

In about 1600, the Koblenz commander moved his seat further down the Rhine to Cologne. In 1794 the Left Bank of the Rhine was conquered by French revolutionary troops and the ecclesiastical estates secularised from 1802 onwards. The Order's premises were refurbished as part of the Prussian Koblenz Fortress. Later in the 19th century, the area was linked by a pier with a downstream sandbank creating the present-day promontory.

Imperial iconography
After the death of Emperor William I in 1888, his grandson William II wished to spark a nationalist cult around the "founder of the German Reich". In the following years the privately funded Kyffhäuser Monument was erected and an Emperor William Monument was inaugurated in Porta Westfalica, both designed by the Leipzig architect Bruno Schmitz. Several other cities had also applied as installation sites and in 1891 William II decided upon the confluence of the Rhine and Mosel rivers at Koblenz. 

After further landfills at the site and a large-scale collection campaign, the official "Emperor William Monument of the Rhine Province" was erected and solemnly inaugurated in the presence of the emperor on 31 August 1897. Another inscription could be found at the statue dedicating it to Wilhelm der Große ("William the Great"). The equestrian statue itself,  in height, presented William I in a general's uniform, reminiscent of the Prussian victories in the "German Wars of Unification". His horse is roped by a winged female genius bearing a laurel wreath and the Imperial Crown.

After World War I under the terms of the Treaty of Versailles, the Rhine Province was occupied by Allied forces. When in November 1929 the area was finally cleared according to the Young Plan, tens of thousands gathered at the Deutsches Eck to celebrate the "liberation of the Rhineland". On 22 July 1930 Reich President Paul von Hindenburg celebrated the completion of his triumphal journey through the Rhenish lands here with a festive banquet and a firework display. Later in the same evening, 38 people were killed when a pontoon bridge across the Mosel collapsed under the weight of the crowds.

Demolition

While the inner city of Koblenz was hit hard by Allied strategic bombing during World War II, the Deutsches Eck remained largely unscathed. On 16 March 1945, however, the statue was badly damaged by an American artillery shell. The Third US Army 87th Artillery unit led by Sergeant Loyd Watson fired upon it after the forward observer saw a German soldier depart from it. They assumed it was a base of operations and it was hit after three attempts. Soon afterwards it was completely taken down. The French military government planned to replace the old memorial with a monument for peace and understanding among nations, but that concept was never realized.
 
After the formation of the Federal Republic of Germany and the German Democratic Republic in 1949, the country was divided into a capitalist west and a communist east. In order to express the deep wish for a united Germany, President Theodor Heuss turned the German Corner into a monument to German unity. As a result, the coats of arms of all German Länder (states), including those of former German territories such as Silesia, East Prussia and Pomerania, were installed. Replacing the destroyed equestrian statue, a German flag flew over the plaza.

After the Berlin Wall came down in November 1989, three concrete parts of the actual wall were installed next to the monument. On 3 October 1990, the emblems of the new federal states were added.

Reinstallation

With German Reunification in 1990, the German Corner no longer served as a symbol of the aspiration for a united Germany. Thus, a discussion arose regarding a remodelling of the plaza. Critics considered the reinstallation of the equestrian statue of Wilhelm I as anachronistic and improper, whereas promoters saw the opportunity for tourist benefits. As the owner of the site, any decision to reinstall a statue of Wilhelm I rested with the government of the Rhineland-Palatinate. However, the state government transferred its rights to the city of Koblenz.   When Werner Theisen, a former newspaper publisher from Koblenz, and his wife Anneliese, announced that they would bear all costs for a reconstruction of the statue, the decision was made to proceed with it.

The Düsseldorf sculptor, Raymond Kittl, was commissioned to produce a replica of the original sculpture and the remodelled statue was created from durable bronze cast unlike the original which had been made from copper plates.  In May 1992, the parts of the statue were brought to Koblenz on board the MS Futura. The assembly work was completed at the port and on 2 September 1993 a mobile lattice boom crane lifted the statue onto the base. The installation took place on Sedan Day, which although no longer officially recognized, was the day on which the German victory in the Battle of Sedan was commemorated. On 25 September 1993, the new statue was inaugurated.

Today, a big national flag and the flags of the 16 Länder are flying at the German Corner as a reminder of German unity. In addition, the flag of the European Union and the flag of the United States of America, which is displayed as a sign of support for the victims of the September 11 attacks. The three parts of the Berlin Wall are now dedicated to the "victims of the division".

Image gallery

The Deutsches Eck is also a place on Germany's inland waterway system where great skill is needed when making a turn, as the animation on the right makes clear.

External links 

 Historic film footage from 1918 showing William I statue at Deutsches Eck from US Army boat on River Rhine, and brief view of Fortress Ehrenbreitstein (end of World War I)
 Marco Zerwas, Iconoclasm Backwards. A Lost Memorial Site. In: Public History Weekly 3 (2015) 18. 

Monuments and memorials to Emperor William I
History of the Rhineland
Equestrian statues in Germany
Rhine
Koblenz
History of Rhineland-Palatinate
Moselle